The Minister of Consumer Affairs was a minister in the government of New Zealand with the responsibilities including corporate law and governance, financial markets, competition policy, consumer policy, protecting intellectual property, and trade policy and international regulatory cooperation, most of which is now administered by the Ministry of Business, Innovation and Employment. The position was established in 1984 and was absorbed into the office of Minister of Commerce and Consumer Affairs after the 2014 general election.

List of ministers
The following ministers held the office of Minister of Consumer Affairs.

Key

See also
Ministry of Business, Innovation and Employment
Minister of Commerce and Consumer Affairs

Notes

References

Consumer Affairs
Economy of New Zealand